The Sts. Peter and Paul Cathedral  also called Kamianets-Podilskyi Cathedral is the name given to a religious building affiliated with the Catholic Church which is in the cathedral square in city of Kamianets-Podilskyi in Khmelnytskyi Oblast in the west part of the European country of Ukraine.

The temple follows the Roman or Latin rite and is home to the Diocese of Kamyanets-Podilsky (Dioecesis Camenecensis Latinorum, Єпархія Кам'янець-Подільський) originally created in 1373 and restored in 1918.

The church was built in the time of Bishop Jakub Buczacki in the 16th century in Renaissance style (the construction of the stone church Bishop Paul attributed Bojańczyce) in the years 1646-1648 was rebuilt in Baroque style. In 1672, during the Turkish occupation of these lands, the temple was transformed temporarily into a mosque and a minaret was built.

He returned a cathedral in 1699. In the middle of the eighteenth century, the cathedral was rebuilt in late Baroque style. On 14 May 1936 the communist authorities closed the temple and transformed it into a museum.

It was temporarily open since the summer of 1941 to 4 June 1945. In the years 1946-1990 the church housed a "museum of atheism". On 13 June 1990 was returned to the Catholic faithful, and on June 29 of that same year the first Mass was celebrated.

See also
Catholic Church in Ukraine
Sts. Peter and Paul Cathedral

References

Roman Catholic cathedrals in Ukraine
Buildings and structures in Kamianets-Podilskyi